Faisal bin Bandar Al Saud is a Saudi royal and the president of the Saudi Arabian Federation for Electronic and Intellectual Sports (SAFEIS) and the Arab eSports Federation since 2017. He is also vice president of the Global Esports Federation.

Early life and education
Faisal's parents are Bandar bin Sultan and Haifa bint Faisal. He is the brother of Reema bint Bandar and Khalid bin Bandar.

Faisal bin Bandar received a bachelor's degree in telecommunications from Baylor University in Waco, Texas, in 2003.

Career
Prince Faisal moved back to Saudi Arabia following his graduation and started several local businesses. In 2012 he established a company called Saker Al Jazirah which focused on recycling, waste management and environmental services. He is also chairman of a media company called Banader Al Khaleej. 

In 2017 Prince Faisal entered government work when he was named the president of the Saudi Arabian Federation for Electronic and Intellectual Sports (SAFEIS) as well as president of the Arab eSports Federation. From 1 December 2021 he is also the vice president of the Global Esports Federation.

Personal life
Faisal bin Bandar married Muneera bint Mohammed bin Rashid Al Jaber Al Rasheed in 2014.

References

Faisal
Baylor University alumni
Faisal
Living people
Saudi Arabian media executives
Faisal
Faisal
Year of birth missing (living people)